Ken Music was a jazz record label based in Japan that distributed CDs in Japan, Germany, North America, and Great Britain.  The company was founded by Kenichi (Ken) Fujiwara in 1989 as a subsidiary of Matsuka USA, which, among other things, manufactured industrial robotic sewing systems for car seat manufacturers.  The label flourished from 1989 to 1992.

Ken artists 

 Conrad Herwig
 Walt Weiskopf (1959)
 Peter Leitch (born 1944)
 Gust William Tsilis (born 1956)
 Jim Snidero
 Dave Stryker
 Axel Grube
 Stan Kenton
 Salvatore Bonafede
 Grover Mitchell
 Ron McClure
 Brian Lynch
 Renee Manning
 Toshiko Akiyoshi
 Ted Rosenthal
 Phil Markowitz
 Fabio Morgera
 Eiji Nakayama
 Joanne Brackeen
 Eddie Gómez
 Jack DeJohnette

Kenichi Fujiwara, founder 
Executive producer
 Ken Fujiwara was an avid jazz fan who had worked as a bandboy for the Count Basie Orchestra on Japanese tours.  He was originally from Tamano, south of Okayama.  Conrad Herwig's connection and first meeting Fujiwara was on a tour of Japan with Toshiko Akiyoshi in mid 1980s.  Fujiwara became of fan of soloists Jim Snidero, Brian Lynch, and Herwig.  He wanted to produce and engineer recordings.  Jujiwara moved to New York City to do so. Fujiwara was an employee of Matsuka Industries in Japan, a relationship that led to launching Ken Music label.  Ken's office at 301 West 57th Street, Suite 26A, Manhattan, New York City, was, at the time, the Matsuka USA headquarters.
Other producers
 Gust Tsilis (né Gust William Tsilis; born 1956) worked for Ken Music, where he produced over 40 CDs.

Matsuka USA Inc. 
Matsuka USA Inc. incorporated in the state of New York on November 1, 1989, and changed its name on November 21, 2001, to Upright Enterprises, Incorporated.  Upright (Akira Matsuka, President; Mieko M. Ajiro, Agent) registered as a foreign corporation in California on February 28, 1995 and kept its corporate domicile in New York.  As of 2012, its California foreign registration was forfeited, although it is an active corporation in New York.

Foreign distribution 
Ken had a distribution agreement with Bellaphon Records in Germany, which gave the Ken Artists a stronger presence in Germany and all of Europe.

Reissues 
The label also reissued recordings for labels that included SeaBreeze.

References 

Record labels established in 1989
Japanese record labels
Jazz record labels